HMS Fowey was a 32-gun fifth rate built by Mr. Flint of Plymouth in 1695/96. She was employed in trade protection and counter-piracy patrols in Home Waters and North America. She was in on the capture of a 50-gun Frenchman while returning from Virginia. She was taken by the French off the Scilly Islands in August 1704.

She was the first vessel to bear the name Fowey in the English and Royal Navy.

Construction and Specifications
She was ordered on 3 May 1695 to be built under contract by Thomas Burgess and William Briggs of Shoreham. She was launched on 7 May 1696. Her builder's measure tonnage was calculated as 377 tons (burthen).

The gun armament initially was four demi-culverins on the lower deck (LD) with two pair of guns per side. The upper deck (UD) battery would consist of between twenty and twenty-two 6-pounder guns with ten or eleven guns per side. The gun battery would be completed by four 4-pounder guns on the quarterdeck (QD) with two to three guns per side.

Commissioned Service 1696-1704
She was commissioned in 1696 under the command of Captain Charles Brittiff. In 1697 sge was under Captain Richard Culliford and stationed at the Nore in the mouth of the River Thames. She sailed to New York in 1698. In 1700 she came under the command of Commander Thomas Legge for service in North America and the West Indies. In 1703, Captain Richard Browne assumed command. In concert with the 60-gun Dreadnought and the 50-gun Falkland She took a 50-gun ship in June 1704. She sailed with a Virginia convoy in 1704.

Loss
She was taken by a squadron of seven French privateers off the Isles of Scilly on 12 August 1704.

In French Service 1704-1711
Her calculated tonnage was 250 tons. Her armament in French service was four 12-pounder guns on the lower deck, with twenty 6-pounder guns on the upper deck, and six 3-pounder guns on the quarterdeck. Her manning was between 160/150 men with 4/5 officers.

In French service she was renamed Le Fouey and spent her time in coast guard service with the French Navy. She was hulked at Brest in 1713 and broken in 1720.

Notes

Citations

References

 Winfield (2009), British Warships in the Age of Sail (1603 – 1714), by Rif Winfield, published by Seaforth Publishing, England © 2009, EPUB 
 Colledge (2020), Ships of the Royal Navy, by J.J. Colledge, revised and updated by Lt Cdr Ben Warlow and Steve Bush, published by Seaforth Publishing, Barnsley, Great Britain, © 2020, EPUB 
 Lavery (1989), The Arming and Fitting of English Ships of War 1600 - 1815, by Brian Lavery, published by US Naval Institute Press © Brian Lavery 1989, Part V Guns, Chapter 18, Type of Guns
 Clowes (1898), The Royal Navy, A History from the Earliest Times to the Present (Vol. II). London. England: Sampson Low, Marston & Company, © 1898
 Roberts (2017), French Warships in the Age of Sail 1626–1786, by Rif Winfield & Stephen S. Roberts, published by Seaforth Publishing, Barnsley, Great Britain, © 2017,  (Epub)

 

Ships of the Royal Navy
1690s ships